Jan Baptist Verrijt (Rotterdam c.1600-1650) was a Dutch composer and organist of the St. Laurenskerk in Rotterdam.

His works are mainly lost, though his Opus 5 was rediscovered in the 1980s.

Works, editions and recordings
Flammae divinae, Op. 5 Motets - recording by Consort of Musicke dir. Anthony Rooley, NM.

References

1600s births
1650 deaths
17th-century classical composers
Carillonneurs
Dutch male classical composers
Dutch classical composers
Dutch classical organists
Male classical organists
Musicians from Rotterdam
17th-century male musicians